Koronis (minor planet designation: 158 Koronis) is a main-belt asteroid that was discovered by Russian astronomer Viktor Knorre on January 4, 1876, from the Berlin observatory. It was the first of his four asteroid discoveries. The meaning of the asteroid name is uncertain, but it may come from Coronis the mother of Asclepius from Greek mythology. Alternatively, it may come from Coronis, a nymph of the Hyades sisterhood. The Koronis family is named after this asteroid.

From its spectrum this is classified as an S-type asteroid, indicating a stony composition. Photometric observations show a synodic rotation period of 14.206 ± 0.002 hours with a brightness variation of 0.28–0.43 in magnitude. A subsequent study at the Altimira Observatory during 2010 was in agreement with this estimate, yielding a rotation period of 14.208 ± 0.040 hours. Based on a model constructed from the lightcurve, the shape of Koronis resembles that of 243 Ida, an asteroid in the same family, although it is a bit larger. 

A collision involving 158 Koronis 15 million years ago created a cluster of 246 objects. 158 Koronis itself retained 98.7% of the total mass. These new objects formed the Koronis(2) family. Koronis(2) is a subfamily of the much larger Koronis family.

References

External links 
 
 

000158
Discoveries by Viktor Knorre
Named minor planets
000158
000158
18760104